See You Again is a 2019 Chinese television series based on the novel of the same name by Sui Houzhu. It stars Tiffany Tang, Shawn Dou and Yang Shuo. It aired on Beijing TV from July 16 to August 7, 2019.

Synopsis
Shi Jian time travels back to the past in her dreams after a plane crash. Armed with knowledge from the future, she decides to solve all her problems beforehand and win over her future husband Ye Jiacheng from the beginning. Unfortunately, the younger Ye Jiacheng is an overly ambitious lad who also has a knack for breaking ladies’ hearts.

Cast

Main
Tiffany Tang as Shi Jian ("Time")
A 31-year-old woman that is Ye Jiacheng's wife. Confident, intelligent, cynical and affectionate, also stubborn enough to keep her own ideals. After her plane accident, she get back into her university day in 10 years ago in her dream when she is still in coma. On her back-days, she promise herself to saves her mother's life and make her ex-boyfriend far from his problem with Yi Qindong, also wants to make her husband falls in love with in advance. However, the young Jiacheng is so different from her husband that she know. By the time goes, Jiacheng finally change and falls in loves with her.
Shawn Dou as Ye Jiacheng
Shi Jian's husband, a young and promising later famous architect. He is confident, flirtatious, ambitious, unrestrained, loyal to ideals and free-spirited.
Yang Shuo as Yi Pei
CEO of the EMAO company. A mysterious and unpredictable man known with his abstinence, calm, unsmiling and cold exterior due to the brunt of his family which he must bears it. His life can be said too tragic as he was born into a wealthy family yet everything change after he meet Shi Jian, a woman whom he fell in love with.

Supporting
Eva Lüyi as Yi Biya
Yi Pei's half maternal aunt and Jiacheng's supposed girlfriend. Beautiful, generous and gracious, she was come from a wealthy family but has a weak resolve and little cowardly.
Lan Yingying as Zhao Wenwen
Yi Pei's fiancée who longing and thirsts for a true love, while later truly like and love him.
Zhou Qiqi as Song Xiaojing
A wealthy woman and Jiacheng's ex-girlfriend. They cancelled their marriage plan due to her problems with Jiacheng's personality and relationship, so they are break as a result.
Mu Le'en as Lai Qiao
Shi Jian's close friend and roommate, which she often calls as Qiao-Qiao. A woman who just wants live with her man as nothing else matters.
Wang Ce as Yi Qindong
Ma Qiyue as child Yi Qindong
Yi Pei's uncle and sometimes become work-rivals. He has no need for love since he costs and benefits trump all.
Li Mao as Zhang Kai
Yi Pei's subordinate and trusted secretary, Shi Jian's mentor. A person who thinks is it is always safer to be reasonably stupid and holds three philosophies at work and teach it to Shi Jian on her first day training.
Qian Yongchen as Chang Jin
Shi Jian's ex-boyfriend who will do anything for money and work in EMAO company.
Feng Lijun as Cheng Zisong
Lao Qiao's boyfriend and later husband.
Chai Haowei as Gao Yanfei
Jiacheng's close friend who always help him when he needs in help. He is funny and likes to make a humor.
Chang Kuo-chu as Old Master Yi
Yi Pei's grandfather. A businessman who believes that big things depend on larger situations and that a person shouldn't be easily influenced by emotions.
Gu Yan as Fang Rou / Rose
Shi Jian's mother and her "Save-object" after get back into 10 years ago who never wants to trouble her beloved daughter.
Juan Zi as Yi Biyun, Yi Pei's mother.
Tang Guozhong as Li Hengli
Wenwen's lover and a street film director who likes to plays women.
Zhang Zhiwei as Professor Song, Xiaojing's father
Yan Xiaoping as Madam Ye
Zhao Weilin as Chen Ke

Production
The series began filming on February 24, 2017 at Shanghai and wrapped up on June 19, 2017 at England.

Soundtrack

Ratings 

 Highest ratings are marked in red, lowest ratings are marked in blue

Awards and nominations

References 

2019 Chinese television series debuts
2019 Chinese television series endings
Chinese romance television series
Television shows based on Chinese novels
Television series by Croton Media